This is a list of the 24 members of the European Parliament for Portugal in the 1984 to 1989 session.

List

References

Portugal
List
1987